Karl Schulze may refer to:

 Karl Schulze (rower)
 Karl Schulze (boxer), see 1925 European Amateur Boxing Championships

See also
Schulze
Carl Schultz, Hungarian film director
Carl Schulz (disambiguation)